The Collector Collector is the third novel by British author Tibor Fischer first published in 1997, by Secker and Warburg in the UK and Henry Holt in the US. It has also been published in Canada and Germany (as Die Voyeurin). Mixed reviews appeared in many notable publications both in the UK and US, for example The Guardian, The New Statesman, The New York Times, The Spectator and The Times Literary Supplement, there being admiration for Fischer's wit and wordplay but a feeling that it lacked a real story. The novel also has been identified as one of the best of the 1990s.

The book is narrated by a bowl which passes between different owners, making it an example of a novel of circulation.

Plot introduction
The narrator of the tale (and the collector of its collectors) is an ancient Sumerian bowl which finds itself in a South London flat of its new owner Rosa.  The bowl not only acts as a repository for 5,000 years of human history but is also able to communicate with those who handle it; reading memories and imparting wisdom...

References

External links
The complete review
Beatrice interview
Chapter One online
review from Spike Magazine
The Collector Collector: Amazon.co.uk: Tibor Fischer: Books

1997 British novels
Novels set in London
Secker & Warburg books